The String Quartet in E major "in old style" (en estilo antiguo) is the only chamber music piece by Spanish composer . It dates back to 1893, the last year he studied with Ruperto Chapí, and was preceded in 1892 by the Symphony in E minor, also subtitled in old style. Though Manrique de Lara was a passionate follower of Richard Wagner, this quartet does not show any traces of it. The first performance of the quartet took place only in 1905 by the members of Madrid Cuarteto Francés. There is a mention of a further 1910 performance. The first modern performance was given by Cuarteto Bécquer (Madrid) in 2015. The same year a critical edition of the score was published by musicologist Diana Díaz.

Structure
The quartet is in four traditional movements, the second commemorating the death of Ludwig van Beethoven (it uses some material from his String Quartet No. 7).
I. Allegro ma non troppo
II. Elegía (26-III-1827). Andante sostenuto
III. Scherzo. Molto vivace
IV. Rondó. Allegretto mosso

An epigraph from Johann Wolfgang von Goethe's poem  is placed before the first movement: Ich bin bei dir; du seist auch noch so ferne, / Du bist mir nah....

References

Sources
Diana Díaz. El cuarteto en Mi bemol en estilo antiguo de Manuel Manrique de Lara. Revista de Musicología. Vol. 36, No. 1/2 (2013), pp. 281–306
Diana Díaz. Una obra recuperada: el Cuarteto de cuerda de Manuel Manrique de Lara (2015) - www.forumclasico.es

External links

Manrique de Lara
Compositions by Manuel Manrique de Lara
1893 compositions
Compositions in E-flat major